Communist Circle of Breda (Marxist–Leninist) was a communist group in Breda, the Netherlands. KKB (ml) was formed in August 1972 by a group of Communist Unity Movement of the Netherlands (Marxist–Leninist) militants in Brabant who refused to shift to Rotterdam when the new party leadership ordered them to do so.

In 1978 the Communist Workers Organisation (KAO), the League of Dutch Marxist-Leninists (BNML) and KKB (ml) merged into the Communist Workers Organisation (Marxist–Leninist) (KAO (ml)).

Defunct communist parties in the Netherlands
Maoist organizations in Europe
Political parties established in 1972
1972 establishments in the Netherlands
Political parties disestablished in 1978
1978 disestablishments in the Netherlands